In chemistry, chloryl refers to a triatomic cation with chemical formula . This species has the same general structure as chlorite but it is electronically different, with chlorine having a +5 oxidation state (rather than the +3 of chlorite). This makes it a rare example of a positively charged oxychloride.

Structure
The Cl–O bond is of bond order 1.5, with its Lewis structure consisting of a double bond and a dative bond which does not utilize d-orbitals.

The strength of interaction with the counterion affects the energy of this antibonding orbital; thus, in colorless chloryl compounds, strong interactions with the counterion, corresponding with the higher covalent character of the bonding, shift the transition energy out of the visible spectrum.

Compounds

There are two categories of chloryl compounds. The first category is colorless, and includes chloryl fluoride. These are moderately reactive. Although named as an ionic "chloryl" compound, chloryl fluoride is more a covalent compound than an ionic compound of fluoride and chloryl cation. 

The second category features red-colored compounds that are highly reactive. These include chloryl fluorosulfate, and dichloryl trisulfate, . These chloryl compounds form red solutions in fluorosulfuric acid, and do contain a red-colored  cation which dissociates in solution. In the solid state, the Raman and infrared spectra indicate strong interactions with the counterion. Not all chloryl compounds in the solid state are necessarily ionic.

One notable chloryl compound is dichlorine hexoxide, which exists as an ionic compound more accurately described as chloryl perchlorate, . It is a red fuming liquid under standard conditions.

For example:

 +  → [ClO2][AsF6]

Other synthesis routes are also possible, including:

5  + 3  → 2 [ClO2][AsF6] +  + 4 

 + 2  → [ClO2][SbF6] +  + 

Metathesis reactions may be carried out with strong Lewis bases. For example, the reaction of the hexafluoroplatinate salt with nitryl fluoride yields the nitronium salt:

[ClO2][PtF6] +  → [NO2][PtF6] +

References

External links

 
Cations
Oxycations
Chlorine oxides